The Sc'ianew First Nation or Beecher Bay First Nation is a First Nations group, governed by a band governmental body of the same name. They are a party involved in the Douglas Treaties and are negotiating a modern treaty as a member of the Te'mexw Treaty Association along with the Malahat, Nanoose, Songhees, and T'Souke Nations. The Sc'ianew First Nation number 261 (as of March, 2020).

Sc'ianew lands are located on southern Vancouver Island in southwestern British Columbia, Canada and include Beecher Bay, Fraser Island, Lamb Island, Long-neck Island, Twin Island, Village Island, and Whale Island.

Languages
The word "Sc'ianew" (pronounced CHEA-nuh) translates from the Klallam language as "the place of the big fish." The group recognizes four ancestral languages though not all are currently spoken.

Historically, the predominant language was Hul’q’umi’num’, the downriver dialect of the Halkomelem Language.

References

Coast Salish governments
Southern Vancouver Island